Germany competed at the 2002 Winter Paralympics in Salt Lake City, United States. 26 competitors from Germany won 33 medals, including 17 gold, 1 silver and 15 bronze and finished 1st in the medal table.

See also 
 Germany at the Paralympics
 Germany at the 2002 Winter Olympics

References 

2002
2002 in German sport
Nations at the 2002 Winter Paralympics